Peter Stefanovic is an Australian journalist, reporter and television presenter.

Stefanovic is currently a co-host of First Edition on Sky News Australia.

He has previously been a co-host of Weekend Today, senior reporter on Nine News and a contributing reporter for current affairs program 60 Minutes.

Career 
Stefanovic began his television career with WIN Television in 2002, reporting for WIN News in both Rockhampton and Canberra.

Stefanovic's career with the Nine Network started in 2004 as a reporter for Nine News and A Current Affair. He later became a foreign correspondent based in Nine's Los Angeles and London bureaus. After serving as a foreign correspondent for many years, Stefanovic returned to Australia in mid-2015 to work as a senior reporter and presenter across the Nine News platform. Stefanovic wrote a book about his time as a foreign correspondent, Hack in a Flak Jacket: Dispatches from an Aussie Foreign Correspondent, which was published by Hachette Australia in 2016.

In early 2016, it was announced that Stefanovic would co-host Weekend Today alongside Deborah Knight. He presented the program until 2017, when he moved across to 60 Minutes, filling in for Allison Langdon who was on maternity leave. Tom Steinfort replaced him as co-host of Weekend Today

In January 2018, Stefanovic returned to Weekend Today as co-host, alongside Allison Langdon. In December 2018, it was announced that Stefanovic would be parting ways with the Nine Network after 15 years. 

In May 2019, it was announced that Stefanovic would join Sky News Australia to co-host First Edition with current host Laura Jayes.

Personal life 
Stefanovic is married to journalist and television presenter Sylvia Jeffreys and they have two children.

Stefanovic was born in Darlinghurst, New South Wales to a Serbian-German father and an Australian mother. Stefanovic is the third of four children to mother Jenny. His siblings include co-host of Today, Karl Stefanovic, an older sister, and a younger brother Tom, who is a former cameraman for Nine News.

References 

Living people
Australian television journalists
Journalists from Sydney
People from Redland City
Australian people of German descent
Australian people of Serbian descent
Year of birth missing (living people)